Frank William Creagh (5 May 1924 – 5 July 1998) was a New Zealand boxer.

He won the gold medal in the men's heavyweight division at the 1950 British Empire Games.

References

1924 births
1998 deaths
Heavyweight boxers
Boxers at the 1950 British Empire Games
Commonwealth Games gold medallists for New Zealand
New Zealand male boxers
Commonwealth Games medallists in boxing
Medallists at the 1950 British Empire Games